The Bell 412 is a utility helicopter of the Huey family manufactured by Bell Helicopter. It is a development of the Bell 212, with the major difference being the composite four-blade main rotor.

Design and development
Development began in the late 1970s with two Bell 212s being converted into 412 prototypes. An advanced four-blade main rotor with a smaller diameter replaced the 212's two-blade rotor. A Bell 412 prototype first flew in August 1979. The initial model was certified in January 1981 with deliveries commencing in the same month. The 412 model was followed by the 412SP (Special Performance) version featuring larger fuel capacity, higher takeoff weight and optional seating arrangements. In 1991, the 412HP (High Performance) variant with improved transmission replaced the SP version in production. The current production version, 412EP (Enhanced Performance), is equipped with a dual digital automatic flight control system. In 2013 Bell introduced the 412EPI which includes an electronic (digital) engine control for a PT6T-9 engine upgrade, and a glass cockpit display system similar to the Bell model 429. Also featured is a Garmin touchscreen navigation system, and the BLR Strake and Fast Fin upgrades for improved hover performance.
Over 700 Model 412s (including 260 by AgustaWestland) have been built.

Variants

Bell 412 Standard Model with P&WC PT6T-3B
 Special Performance version with P&WC PT6T-3BF engines
Bell 412HP High performance version with P&WC PT6T-3BG or -3D engines
Bell 412CF (CH-146 Griffon) 100 custom-built utility transport helicopters for the Canadian Forces, based on 412EP and designated by Bell as 412CF
 Enhanced performance version with P&WC PT6T-3DF engines
Bell 412EPIGlass cockpit version with P&WC PT6T-9 electronic controlled engines
Bell Griffin HT1 Advanced training helicopter based on the Bell 412EP, operated by the Royal Air Force (RAF) since 1997 as an advanced flying trainer. Operated by the Defence Helicopter Flying School at RAF Shawbury and the Search and Rescue Training Unit at RAF Valley.
Bell Griffin HAR2 Search and Rescue helicopter based on the Bell 412EP, operated by No. 84 Squadron RAF since 2003 at RAF Akrotiri in Cyprus.
Agusta-Bell AB 412Civil utility transport version, built under license in Italy by Agusta.
Agusta-Bell AB 412EP Italian-built version of the Bell 412EP.
Agusta-Bell AB 412 Grifone Military utility transport version, built under licence in Italy by Agusta.

Agusta-Bell AB 412 CRESO Italian-built version, fitted with a ground surveillance radar.
NBell 412 Indonesian IPTN's licensed product of Bell 412

Subaru-Bell UH-2 (formerly UH-X)Modified version of the Bell 412 EPI; 150 on order to meet the JGSDF's requirement for a UH-1J replacement.
Subaru-Bell 412EPXCommercial version of UH-X.

Operators
The Bell 412 is used by private and commercial operators. It is particularly popular in the oil industries, military, and for law enforcement use.

Military operators

Algerian Air Force

Argentine Air Force

Azerbaijani Air Force

Bahraini Air Force

Botswana Defence Force

Cameroon Air Force

Chilean Air Force

Colombian Navy

Cypriot National Guard

Dominican Air Force (2 on order)

Air Force of El Salvador

Eritrean Air Force

Ghana Air Force

Guatemalan Air Force

Guyana Defence Force

Honduran Air Force

Indonesian Army
Indonesian Navy

Iraqi Air Force (12 on order)

Italian Army
Carabinieri

Jamaica Defence Force

Japan Ground Self Defence Force

Lesotho Defence Force

Mexican Air Force

Montenegrin Air Force

Moroccan Navy

Nigerian Air Force

Royal Norwegian Air Force

Pakistan Air Force
Pakistan Army

National Aeronaval Service of Panama

Peruvian Air Force

Peruvian Navy

Philippine Air Force

Royal Saudi Air Force

Slovenian Air Force

South Korean Air Force

Sri Lanka Air Force

Tanzania People's Defense Force

Royal Thai Air Force
Royal Thai Police

Tunisian Air Force

Turkish Coast Guard

United Arab Emirates Air Force

Royal Air Force

National Navy of Uruguay (2 on order)

Venezuelan Army
Venezuelan Navy

Air Force of Zimbabwe

Government operators

Ambulance Victoria (replaced with the AgustaWestland AW139 in 2016)
Babcock Mission Critical Services
Department of Fire and Emergency Services, Western Australia
Emergency Management Queensland
New South Wales Police Force
New South Wales Rural Fire Service
MedSTAR

Canton of Sarajevo Police

Federal Police

Canadian Coast Guard 7 Bell 412EPI
National Research Council
Surete du Quebec

National Police of Colombia

Republic of Croatia Ministry of Interior - 2 Suburu Bell 412EPXs for delivery in October 2023

Police of the Czech Republic

Finnish Border Guard

Indonesian National Police - 1 NBell 412 and 2 NBell 412EP

Iranian Red Crescent Society

Guardia di Finanza
State Forestry Corps

Japan Coast Guard
Tokyo Metropolitan Police Department

Coast Guard

Slovenian National Police

Chicago Fire Department
Delaware State Police
Los Angeles City Fire Department
Los Angeles County Fire Department
Miami-Dade County Fire Department
New York City Police Department Aviation Unit
Orange County Fire Authority
San Diego Fire Department
United States Park Police
Ventura County Fire Department
Virginia State Police

Former operators

Uganda Air Force

Incidents and accidents
On April 4, 1991, a Bell 412 and Piper Aerostar collided in mid-air over a suburb of Philadelphia, Pennsylvania. All five people on both aircraft, including United States senator John Heinz, along with two children on the ground, were killed.

On April 22, 1994, a Bell 412 medical Helicopter AirCare from North Carolina Baptist Hospital crashed into mountainous terrain near Bluefield, West Virginia, killing all four crew members on board.

On 9 July 2002, a Bell 412 from the El Salvador Air Force crashed after a lightning strike, killing all four crew members and three passengers on board.

On December 10, 2006, a Bell 412 medical helicopter Mercy Air 2 crashed in mountainous terrain near Hesperia, California. All three crew members on board died.

Specifications (412EP)

See also

References

Citations

Sources

 Hoyle, Craig. "World Air Forces Directory". Flight International, Vol. 180, No. 5321, 13–19 December 2011. pp. 26–52.

External links

Bell Helicopter 412EP official page

1980s United States helicopters
1980s United States civil utility aircraft
1980s Canadian helicopters
Twin-turbine helicopters
Aircraft first flown in 1979
412